Flying Dust 105O is an Indian reserve of the Flying Dust First Nation in Saskatchewan.

References

Indian reserves in Saskatchewan